Lustre is a Swedish black metal band; the musical project of Henrik Sunding who goes under the pseudonym "Nachtzeit". Lustre began in 2008 after the dissolve of The Burning. Prior to both, Sunding also used to be a drummer of the band Hypothermia.

Unlike most black metal artists, Lustre uses guitars and vocals as background instruments and instead uses keyboards and synths as the primary instrument. Lustre's lyrical themes include nature, darkness, mysticism, and spirituality.

Discography

References

External links 
 
 

Swedish black metal musical groups